Szymon Marcin Kossakowski (1741 in Šilai, Jonava – 1794) was a Polish–Lithuanian nobleman (szlachcic), and one of the leaders of the Targowica Confederation. In 1793, he became the last Grand Hetman of Lithuania.

Biography
He participated in the Radom Confederation and the Bar Confederation. A supporter of the Russian Empire during the Kościuszko Uprising and earlier, he was deemed a traitor. In the aftermath of the Vilnius Uprising he tried to escape by boat, but was captured and hanged in the town hall square of Vilnius with the inscription of He who swings will not drown and was buried in the cellars of the church in Jonava.

References

1741 births
1794 deaths
People from Jonava District Municipality
People from Trakai Voivodeship 
Szymon
Field Hetmans of the Grand Duchy of Lithuania
Great Hetmans of the Grand Duchy of Lithuania
Polish generals in other armies
Bar confederates
Targowica confederates
People executed for treason against Poland
Russian people of the Polish–Russian War of 1792
Recipients of the Order of the White Eagle (Poland)
People executed by the Polish–Lithuanian Commonwealth
Executed Polish people
Executed Lithuanian people
People executed by Poland by hanging
19th-century executions